Caprice Stella Benedetti (born August 1, 1965) is an American actress. She is best known for her role in the 2000 science fiction movie Timequest in which she played Jacqueline Kennedy.  She also appeared as Maria Owens, the matriarch of the Owens clan, in the 1998 romantic fantasy film Practical Magic.

Life and career 
She went to Saint Benedict's school in Seattle, Washington during her elementary years. She attended Blanchet High School in Seattle. She was "discovered" at the Northgate Mall.

Caprice played a brief supporting role in Charmed as the Angel of Light Guardian of the Hollow in the Season 4 episode "Charmed and Dangerous", and appeared in Slow Burn.

Filmography

References

External links
 
 

1966 births
Living people
American film actresses
American television actresses
Actresses from Seattle
Bishop Blanchet High School alumni
21st-century American women